Lincoln City Knights were a rugby league team based in Lincoln, Lincolnshire. They played in the Rugby League Conference.

History
Lincoln City Knights joined the North Midlands Division of the Rugby League Conference in 2005. The division was rebranded the North Midlands & South Yorkshire Division for the 2006 season, merged into the Yorkshire & Lincolnshire division 2007, separated out as the South Yorkshire & Lincolnshire Division for the 2008 before reverting to the North Midlands in 2009. Another rebrand saw it become the Yorkshire Regional division in 2010. Lincoln City Knights struggled to raise a team on many occasions in the 2010 season and have since folded.

External links
Official site
Lincoln City Knights facebook page

Rugby League Conference teams
Sport in Lincoln, England
Rugby clubs established in 2005
Rugby league teams in Lincolnshire